Gertrude 'Trude' Wildam was a female Austrian international table tennis player.

She six World Table Tennis Championships medals; she won a bronze at the 1926 World Table Tennis Championships with Eduard Freudenheim, three years later at the 1929 World Table Tennis Championships she won another bronze in the mixed doubles with Alfred Liebster and two silver medals in the women's singles  and doubles with Fanchette Flamm.

The final two bronze medals were won at the 1930 World Table Tennis Championships in the women's singles and doubles with Helly Reitzer.

See also
 List of table tennis players
 List of World Table Tennis Championships medalists

References

Austrian female table tennis players
World Table Tennis Championships medalists